Bosnia and Herzegovina National Badminton Championships are held since the year 2008.

Past winners

Junior champions

References
badmintoneurope.com

Badminton in Bosnia and Herzegovina
National badminton championships
Bad
Recurring sporting events established in 2008
2008 establishments in Bosnia and Herzegovina